Alice Parker may refer to:
Alice Parker (born 1925), American composer, arranger, conductor, and teacher
Alice Parker (Salem witch trials), executed in 1692
Alice C. Parker, American electrical engineer
Alice H. Parker (1895–1920), African American inventor
Alice Parker Lesser (1863–1939), American lawyer, suffragist, and clubwoman